Robert Harris (10 October 1882 – 17 March 1959) was a Scottish amateur golfer. He won the 1925 the Amateur Championship and was the low amateur in the Open Championship the same year. He was the British Walker Cup captain on three occasions.

Harris was the son of William Harris, one of the founders of a stationery company, Burns & Harris, in Dundee, Scotland. Harris moved to London and was a member of the Stock Exchange.

As well as winning the Amateur Championship in 1925, he was also twice runner-up, losing 6&5 to Harold Hilton in 1913 and 7&6 to Roger Wethered in 1923. His 1925 win over Kenneth Fradgley by 13&12 was a record win in the Amateur Championship at the time. Harris was 6 up after 7 holes and 9 up after 18. He then won 4 of the first 6 of the second round to complete his victory.

He wrote a book "Sixty Years of Golf" published in 1953.

Amateur wins
this list is incomplete
1911 Golf Illustrated Gold Vase
1912 Golf Illustrated Gold Vase
1925 The Amateur Championship

Major championships

Wins (1)

Results timeline

Note: Harris only played in The Open Championship.

LA = Low amateur
NT = No tournament
"T" indicates a tie for a place

Team appearances
Walker Cup (representing Great Britain): 1922 (playing captain), 1923 (playing captain), 1926 (playing captain), 1930
England–Scotland Amateur Match (representing Scotland): 1905 (winners), 1908 (winners), 1910, 1911 (winners), 1912 (winners), 1922 (winners), 1923 (winners), 1924, 1925, 1926, 1927 (tie), 1928
Coronation Match (representing the Amateurs): 1911

References

Scottish male golfers
Amateur golfers
Sportspeople from Dundee
Golfers from London
1882 births
1959 deaths